Presidential elections were held in Colombia on 31 May 1998, with a second round on 21 June. Although Horacio Serpa of the Liberal Party received the most votes in the first round, the result was a victory for Andrés Pastrana Arango of the Great Alliance for Change, who received 50.3% of the vote in the run-off.

Results

References

Presidential elections in Colombia
Colombia
1998 in Colombia
May 1998 events in South America
June 1998 events in South America